Dimajankesh (also Romanized as Dīmājānkesh) is a village in Kojid Rural District, Rankuh District, Amlash County, Gilan Province, Iran. At the 2006 census, its population was 205, in 56 families.

References 

Populated places in Amlash County